The 2017 World RX of France was the ninth round of the fourth season of the FIA World Rallycross Championship. The event was held at the Circuit de Lohéac in the Lohéac commune of Bretagne.

Supercar

Heats

Semi-finals
Semi-Final 1

Semi-Final 2

Final

Standings after the event

 Note: Only the top five positions are included.

References

External links

|- style="text-align:center"
|width="35%"|Previous race:2017 World RX of Canada
|width="40%"|FIA World Rallycross Championship2017 season
|width="35%"|Next race:2017 World RX of Latvia
|- style="text-align:center"
|width="35%"|Previous race:2016 World RX of France
|width="40%"|World RX of France
|width="35%"|Next race:2018 World RX of France
|- style="text-align:center"

France
World RX
World RX